Chryseomicrobium imtechense  is a Gram-positive, rod-shaped, strictly aerobic, non-spore-forming and non-motile bacterium from the genus of Chryseomicrobium which has been isolated from seawater from Bengal in India.

References

Further reading 
 

Bacillales
Bacteria described in 2011